The Ampoi is a river in the Apuseni Mountains, Alba County, western Romania. It is a right tributary of the river Mureș. It flows through the town Zlatna, and joins the Mureș near Alba Iulia.

Tributaries
The following rivers are tributaries to the Ampoi (from source to mouth):

Left: Valea Petrei, Vâltori, Feneș, Valea lui Bibaț, Valea Albinei, Ampoița and Ighiu
Right: Trâmpoiele, Valea Mare, Valea Mică and Galați

References

Rivers of Romania
Rivers of Alba County